The New York State Division of Parole was an agency of the government of New York within the New York State Correctional Services from 1930 to 2011. § 259. "1. There shall be in the executive department of state government a state division of parole" responsible for parole, the  supervised release of a prisoner before the completion of his/her sentence. In 2011, the agency merged with the Department of Correctional Services to form the New York State Department of Corrections and Community Supervision.

Functions

Parole Officers 
Parole officers work to develop a supervision plan for each releasee. They also assess and evaluate the adequacy of each releasee's community adjustment and intervene when the releasee's behavior threatens that adjustment. The parole officer, in consultation with his or her supervisor, determines when and under what circumstances delinquency action is warranted. The parole officer works to ensure that individuals released from prison by order of the Board of Parole and by statute live and remain at liberty in the community without violating the law. When a parolee or conditional releasee violates conditions of release the parole officer, as a peace officer will take the subject into custody with or without a warrant, and usually return them to the nearest correctional facility.

Board of Parole 
The Board of Parole consists of up to 19 members. Each member is appointed by the Governor and confirmed by the Senate for a six-year term. One member is designated by the Governor to serve as Chairman and Chief Executive Officer of the Division.

The Board determines which inmates serving indeterminate sentences in state prison may be released on Parole. The Executive Law (Section 259-i (2) (a)) requires the Board to personally interview inmates eligible for release. Inmates do not have the right to counsel at release interviews. The typical panel consists of two or three board members who are responsible for:
Interviewing the inmate;
Reviewing summary reports prepared by facility parole officers; and
Determining whether the inmate will be released to parole supervision.

The Board sets conditions of release for inmates released on parole. In addition, it sets release conditions for inmates "conditionally released" to supervision by statute. These inmates earned time off their maximum sentence for good behavior. Sentencing reforms enacted in 1995 and 1998 change sentences for violent felony offenders. Violent offenders now receive determinant prison sentences and are released to parole supervision without appearing before the Board for release consideration. However, the Board still imposes conditions of release for these offenders.

Under Executive Law (Section 259-i (3) (f) (x)), the Board has the authority to revoke parole when it determines a releasee has violated the conditions of release "in an important respect." Board action may return the individual to State prison or impose other appropriate sanctions. In some cases, Board action has been delegated to Administrative Hearing Officers. Under the authority of the Board, the Division adjudicates due process violations.

All decisions of Board panels and Administrative Hearing Officers may be appealed. These appeals are made directly to the Parole Board. Also, the Board, at the Governor's request, interviews clemency applicants and makes recommendations to the Governor. The Board delegates its statutory authority to investigate requests to the Division's Executive Clemency Unit.

History of Parole in New York State 
In 1817, the nation's first "good time" law, rewarding prison inmates with time off their period of imprisonment for good behavior, was approved in New York State. In 1824, indeterminate sentencing for juveniles was established.

In 1867, the Prison Association appointed a committee to prepare a plan for revision of New York's prison system, based upon United Kingdom penal reforms. In preparing their report, the Prison Association's committee visited prisons throughout the United States and Canada, including the Detroit House of Corrections, then under the supervision of Zebulon Brockway. The resulting report called for the creation of "reformatories," institutions specifically designed to "teach and train the prisoner in such a manner that, on his discharge, he may be able to resist temptation and inclined to lead an upright, worthy life." Subsequently, in 1869, New York governor John T. Hoffman endorsed the report, and the legislature authorized the creation of what would become, on its completion in May 1876, the New York State Reformatory at Elmira – the world's first reformatory prison for "youthful offenders," first-time male offenders between the ages of 16 and 30.

Reformatories
New York would pay special attention to the Declaration of Principles adopted by Congress in creating its juvenile reformatory at Elmira, of which the state hired Brockway as superintendent. The 1876 law officially establishing Elmira called for five "respectable citizens" to serve as its board of managers. While the 1876 act did not call for indeterminate sentencing or parole, 1877 legislation drafted by Brockway required that all Elmira inmates serve indefinite sentences: while prisoners were technically sentenced to six years, they could be paroled any time at the discretion of the Board of Managers. The 1877 law contained as well the first statutory use in the United States of the word "parole," used in place of "conditional discharge."

Guardians
In 1876, New York State passed a system of "indeterminate" sentences setting a minimum and maximum term and permitting parole release of those who had served the minimum; those selected by prison officials for parole were required to report monthly to citizen volunteers known as "Guardians." New York's statutory introduction of parole in 1877 represented the first official use in the United States of both the term and its practice.

Parole process

Although allowed, a system of parole would not be instituted at Elmira until 1882, when Brockway established the factors to be determined in assessing each inmate's suitability for early release: offense, offense history, institutional behavior, work record, academic progress, attitude, future plans, and – most importantly – perceived threat of recidivism. Inmates were required to secure employment and a place to live before their release on parole. After release, parolees were required to follow four rules designed to make certain they became "good workers" and "good citizens." First, they had to remain employed for six months. Second, they had to submit a monthly report, signed by their employer, showing their income and expenses and providing "a general statement" of their lives and "surroundings." Third, they could not quit or change jobs. Parolees who violated any of these conditions had their parole revoked.

Reception
Brockway's parole system was widely seen as successful – not least due to his affinity for public relations – and, in 1900, the United States government included in reports submitted to the International Prison Commission an essay by Brockway on his Elmira system. There, Brockway summed up his commitment to penal reform rather than retribution:

However, Brockway's success was tempered by accusations of corruption and abuse. A Board of Charities inquiry conducted in 1893 and 1894 found that Elmira was a brutal and ineffective prison, allegations which would haunt the rest of Brockway's tenure. In 1900, the same year Brockway extolled the virtues of his reformatory system to the International Prison Commission, Governor Theodore Roosevelt replaced three Elmira managers who supported Brockway, shortly after which the other two managers resigned. Brockway himself resigned soon thereafter. In 1901, Elmira's new board of managers, echoing the Board of Charities inquiry, published a critique of the reformatory in its annual report, citing its poor physical condition, inadequate medical care, administrative corruption, and brutal disciplinary techniques including flogging.

20th century
Nevertheless, Brockway's reforms had proved popular, and indeterminate sentencing spread widely through the US in the wake of his tenure at Elmira, and, in 1907, New York became the first state to adopt all the components of a modern parole system: indeterminate sentencing, a system for granting release, post-release supervision, and specific criteria for parole revocation.

On July 1, 1930, the Division of Parole was established in the Executive Department. A full-time Board of Parole was created within the Division and given the responsibility, formerly held by the Department of Corrections, for decisions on parole releases from prisons. Jurisdiction over releases from training schools and correctional institutions for mentally disabled prisoners was added to the Parole Board's authority in 1945.

A 1967 law extended the Board's release authority to persons incarcerated in local reformatories, transferred the functions of the New York City Parole Commission to the New York State Division of Parole and gave the agency control over the conditional release of inmates under definite sentences.

In 1971, the Division of Parole was consolidated with the Department of Corrections to form the Department of Correctional Services (DOCS). In the wake of the Attica Prison riot and demands from the courts and other quarters that the procedural rights of parolees be protected, Parole in 1977 was again established as an autonomous agency within the Executive Department. The same reform act mandated adoption of formal release guidelines to eliminate any perception of arbitrariness.

A 1978 law made the Division of Parole responsible for the release decision for juveniles convicted of certain serious felonies and for their post-release community supervision. With the surge in incarcerations in the 1980s and 1990s, the Division of Parole expanded significantly, as did the array of substance abuse treatment and other services available to help releasees maintain a law-abiding life style.

The Sentencing Reform Act of 1998, commonly referred to as Jenna's Law, added a new dimension to the Division through the elimination of discretionary release for all violent felony offenders while mandating court-imposed periods of post-release supervision of 1.5 to 5 years that the offender must serve after completing the period of incarceration imposed by the court.

On April 1, 2011, the Division of Parole was once again merged with the New York State Department of Correctional Services to form the New York State Department of Corrections and Community Supervision.

See also

 List of law enforcement agencies in New York
 Parole
 New York State Department of Correctional Services
 New York State Division of Probation and Correctional Alternatives
 New York City Department of Corrections
 New York City Department of Probation
 ParoleWatch

Notes

References

External links
Official website
 Division of Parole in the New York Codes, Rules and Regulations

State law enforcement agencies of New York (state)
Penal system in New York (state)